Hauge Reef is a chain of islands and rocks extending in an east-northeast direction from the eastern extremity of Annenkov Island to a point about  west-southwest of Cape Darnley, South Georgia. It was first charted in 1819 by a Russian expedition under Fabian Gottlieb von Bellingshausen. The reef was surveyed by the South Georgia Survey (SGS), 1951–52, and named for Captain Ole Hauge, of the sealer Albatros, whose knowledge of the coasts of South Georgia was of great assistance to the SGS.

See also
Hauge Strait
Low Reef
Pillow Rock

References

Reefs of Antarctica
Geography of South Georgia and the South Sandwich Islands